Beffa is a surname. Notable people with the surname include:

Alberto Della Beffa (1914–1969), Italian bobsledder and Olympian
Jean-Louis Beffa (born 1941), French businessman
Karol Beffa (born 1973), French-Swiss composer and pianist

Italian-language surnames